The van Paemel Family is a 1986 Belgian historic drama directed by Paul Cammermans, based on a play written by Cyriel Buysse. The film received the André Cavens Award for Best Film by the Belgian Film Critics Association (UCC). It was also entered into the 15th Moscow International Film Festival.

Cast
 Senne Rouffaer as Mr. van Paemel, the patriarch
 Chris Boni as Mrs. van Paemel, his wife
 Marijke Pinoy as Romanie van Paemel, the youngest daughter
 Jos Verbist as Désiré van Paemel, a son
 Marc Van Eeghem as Kamiel van Paemel, a son
 Ronny Waterschoot as Eduard van Paemel, the oldest son

Plot
The family patriarch Van Paemel is a farmer on baron de Wilde's estate. His mild-mannered son Désire is accidentally shot during a hunting party on the estate and remains an invalid.
Eduard, the eldest son, is a member of the socialist workers' movement and involved in strike actions in the city.
Against her father's wishes, his daughter Cordule starts an affair with the poacher Masco. His youngest daughter, Romanie, is forced to work as a domestic servant at the castle, where she is seduced by Maurice, the baron's son and heir, and becomes pregnant. When the youngest son Kamiel also has to leave the farm because he is drafted into the army, the lack of workers on Van Paemel's farm becomes critical.
As a result, the family is evicted from their home because they cannot pay the rent. Three of the children emigrate to the US, one becomes a nun and one dies, until only the farmer and his wife remain.

References

External links
 

1986 films
1980s historical drama films
Belgian films based on plays
Films set in Belgium
Films shot in Belgium
Works set in Flanders
1980s Dutch-language films
Belgian historical drama films
1986 drama films
Dutch-language Belgian films